Ulla Hoffmann (born 31 March 1942) is a Swedish Left Party politician. Hoffmann was interim party leader for a short while in 2003 following the resignation of party leader Gudrun Schyman. Gudrun Schyman was forced to resign due to tax irregularities. She was a member of the Riksdag from 1994 to 2006.

References

External links
Ulla Hoffmann at the Riksdag website

1942 births
21st-century Swedish women politicians
European democratic socialists
Leaders of political parties in Sweden
Living people
Members of the Riksdag 1994–1998
Members of the Riksdag 1998–2002
Members of the Riksdag 2002–2006
Members of the Riksdag from the Left Party (Sweden)
People from Solna Municipality
Socialist feminists
Swedish feminists
Women members of the Riksdag